Game is a 2002 Indian Tamil-language action drama film directed by John Amritraj. The film stars Karthik and Vinod Kumar. The film, produced by Srimasani Amman Pictures, had a musical scores by S. P. Venkatesh and was released after several delays on 4 November 2002 to negative reviews.

Cast

Karthik as Raja
Vinod Kumar as Joseph IPS
Manoj K. Jayan as Lenin
Radha as Jaya
Urvashi as Janaki
Rajashree as Malar
John Amritraj as GK
R. Sundarrajan
Major Sundarrajan as S. Ramakrishnan I.P.S
Pandu
Vichu Vishwanath
Kazan Khan
Vijay Krishnaraj as Muthu Krishnan
Rani
Divya Dutta
Manikraj
Kullamani
Vincent Roy
Thideer Kannaiah
Mahanadi Shankar
Manager Cheema

Production
John Amritraj had originally planned the film with Karthik in the late 1990s as Koottali which also had Divya Dutta in the cast, though delays meant that the film's budget and cast were subsequently affected. For the film, Karthik participated in a song sequence shot with 100 car lights, sung by Anuradha Sreeram and performed by Rani. The film went through production slowly and changed its name to Game, having a delayed release in 2002.

Soundtrack 
Soundtrack was composed by S. P. Venkatesh.
"Jimba" - Mano, Swarnalatha
"Dhak Dhak" - Anuradha Sriram
"Achacho" - Swarnalatha
"Dosthu" - Suresh Peters, Krishna Sundar
"Kuchipudi" - Mano, Sujatha
"Pesi Pesi" - Anuradha Sriram, Adithyan

References

2002 films
Indian action drama films
2000s Tamil-language films
2002 action thriller films